Stanley James Collard (born 25 March 1936) is an Australian retired politician. Born at Maleny, Queensland, he was a locomotive engine driver before entering politics. In 1975, he was elected to the Australian Senate as a Country Party Senator for Queensland. He remained in the Senate until his retirement in 1987. He was also leader of the National Party in the Senate from 1985 to 1987.

References

National Party of Australia members of the Parliament of Australia
Members of the Australian Senate for Queensland
Members of the Australian Senate
1936 births
Living people
20th-century Australian politicians